Igor Súkenník (born 25 October 1989) is a Slovak football player who currently plays for Viktoria Žižkov.

External links
 
 
 
 Profile on FK Viktoria Žižkov site

1989 births
Living people
Slovak footballers
Slovak Super Liga players
Czech First League players
FC Spartak Trnava players
FC Slovan Liberec players
FC Hradec Králové players
FK Viktoria Žižkov players
Expatriate footballers in the Czech Republic
Association football midfielders
Sportspeople from Trnava
MFK Vítkovice players
Slovak expatriate sportspeople in the Czech Republic
Czech National Football League players
FK Fotbal Třinec players
Bohemian Football League players